Chromodomain-helicase-DNA-binding protein 4 is an enzyme that in humans is encoded by the CHD4 gene.

Function 

The product of this gene belongs to the SNF2/RAD54 helicase family. It represents the main component of the nucleosome remodeling and deacetylase complex and plays an important role in epigenetic transcriptional repression. Patients with dermatomyositis develop antibodies against this protein.

Interactions 

CHD4 has been shown to interact with HDAC1, Histone deacetylase 2, MTA2, SATB1 and Ataxia telangiectasia and Rad3 related.

Clinical

Mutations in this gene have been associated with a condition known as Sifrim-Hitz-Weiss syndrome. This condition is characterized by

 Brain anomalies
 Macrocephaly
 Deafness
 Ophthalmic abnormalities
 Dysmorphic features
 Congenital heart defects
 Hypogonadism in males
 Skeletal and limb anomalies
 Global developmental delay
 Mild to moderate intellectual disability

References

External links

Further reading